Schmerikon railway station is a railway station situated in the municipality of Schmerikon in the Swiss canton of St. Gallen. It is located on the Rapperswil to Ziegelbrücke line.

The station is served by the inter-regional Voralpen Express, which links Lucerne and St. Gallen via Rapperswil and Wattwil, and by St. Gallen S-Bahn service S6 that operates south-east to Schwanden via Ziegelbrücke. Both trains run hourly, combining to provide a half-hourly service to Rapperswil.

Services 
 the following services stop at Schmerikon:

References

External links 

Railway stations in the canton of St. Gallen
Swiss Federal Railways stations